Merkatz is a surname of German-language origin. Notable people with the surname include:

Hans-Joachim von Merkatz (1905–1982), German politician
Karl Merkatz (1930–2022), Austrian actor

German-language surnames